Robert Taylor Burton (25 October 1821 – 11 November 1907) was a member of the presiding bishopric of the Church of Jesus Christ of Latter-day Saints (LDS Church) from 1874 until his death. He was also one of the principal officers in the Nauvoo Legion during its Utah reconstitution (including during the Utah War) and led the territorial militia against the Morrisites during the 1862 Morrisite War.

Born in Amherstburg, Upper Canada, Burton was called by Presiding Bishop Edward Hunter to be his second counselor in 1874. Burton served in this capacity until Hunter's death in 1883. When William B. Preston was called to be the new Presiding Bishop in 1884, Burton was asked to serve as his first counselor. Burton served in this capacity until his death.

Burton joined the LDS Church in Upper Canada in 1838.

In 1856, Burton was part of the rescue party sent from Salt Lake City to assist the stranded Martin Handcart Company near the Sweetwater River. In 1870, Burton was tried and acquitted for the murder of Isabella Bowman, a person who had been killed by Utah militia while surrendering in the Morrisite War.

Burton practiced plural marriage and fathered 27 children. He married his first wife, Maria S. Haven (1826–1920) in 1845. He married his other two wives, Sarah A. Garr and Susan E. McBride in 1856.  He is the great-great-grandfather of a former presiding bishop of the LDS Church, H. David Burton.

Burton died at Salt Lake City and was buried at Salt Lake City Cemetery.

See also
 Council on the Disposition of the Tithes
 Nauvoo Brass Band
 Orrin P. Miller

Notes

External links

 Robert Taylor Burton brass band drum score, Vault MSS 16 at L. Tom Perry Special Collections, Harold B. Lee Library, Brigham Young University

1821 births
1907 deaths
Burials at Salt Lake City Cemetery
Canadian bishops
Canadian general authorities (LDS Church)
Converts to Mormonism
Counselors in the Presiding Bishopric (LDS Church)
Mormon pioneers
Nauvoo Legion
People acquitted of murder
People from Amherstburg, Ontario
People of the Utah War
Pre-Confederation Canadian emigrants to the United States